{{Infobox film
| name           = The Purge
| image          = The_Purge_film_poster.jpg
| caption        = Theatrical release poster
| director        = James DeMonaco
| producer       = 
| writer         = James DeMonaco
| starring       = 
| music          = Nathan Whitehead
| cinematography = Jacques Jouffret
| editing        = Peter Gvozdas
| production_companies = 
| distributor    = Universal Pictures
| released       = 
| runtime        = 85 minutes Edwin Hodge (The Stranger), Tyler Osterkamp (The Freak), and Nathan Clarkson (The Purger) were the only cast members to reprise their role, while only Hodge was credited.

A third film, The Purge: Election Year, was released on July 1, 2016. A fourth film, The First Purge, which is set as a prequel in the franchise, was released on July 4, 2018. Ethan Hawke reprises his role as James Sandin in the opening scene of "7:01am", the series finale of The Purge television series. A fifth film, The Forever Purge, was released on July 2, 2021.

See also

 The Purge (franchise)
 List of films featuring home invasions

References

External links
 
 The Purge Mask
 
 
 

2013 films
2013 action thriller films
2013 crime thriller films
2013 horror thriller films
2010s action horror films
American action horror films
American action thriller films
American crime thriller films
American horror thriller films
Crime horror films
American dystopian films
Films about dysfunctional families
Films directed by James DeMonaco
Films produced by Andrew Form
Films produced by Bradley Fuller
Films produced by Jason Blum
Films produced by Michael Bay
Films set in 2022
Films set in the future
Films set in Los Angeles
Films shot in Los Angeles
Films with screenplays by James DeMonaco
Films about the upper class
Home invasions in film
Urban survival films
Platinum Dunes films
Blumhouse Productions films
The Purge films
2010s English-language films
2010s American films